XBill is an arcade style game for the X Window System. The game features a bespectacled character known as "Bill" (a spoof of Bill Gates). The goal is to prevent Bill's legions of clones from installing "Wingdows", a virus "cleverly designed to resemble a popular operating system" (a parody of Windows), on a variety of computers running other operating systems. It was very popular among Linux gamers at the end of the 1990s, beating out Quake, though not Quake II, as Linux Journal reader's favourite Linux game in 1999.

Gameplay 
The operating systems are represented by logos shown on the computer screens. The computers the player must defend include PCs running Linux and BSD, SPARCstations with Solaris, SGI IRIX workstations, Apple Macintosh, PalmPilots, and NeXTcubes. When Bill installs Wingdows onto a computer, its current operating system is placed beside it.

Using the mouse, the player must squash Bill and drag discarded operating systems back to their computers. At the end of the level, points are accrued for every computer that is still running its original operating system.

On later levels, computers are connected to each other with LAN cables, causing Wingdows to spread faster. Some computers may also catch fire. This can be cured by dragging buckets of water onto them.

History 
The game was written by Brian Wellington and Matias Duarte in summer 1994. Originally written in C++, the code base was later with version 2.1 refactored to C.

The game was later in the end 1990s, deliberately ported to Microsoft Windows. Ports to many other platforms as Mac OS X, Openmoko, Android, and Maemo phones followed due to its open source nature. Re-implementations of the game also exist.

In 2009, the project was resurrected as XBill-NG, similar in concept to Lincity-NG.

Reception and impact 
XBill was very popular among Linux gamers at the end of the 1990s, beating out Quake, though not Quake II, as Linux Journal readers' favourite Linux game in 1999.

The game holds four out of five stars on the Linux Game Tome and was noted by DesktopLinux.com.

Despite its status, it is not always packaged with Linux distributions due to its "disparaging" content: for instance Fedora does not integrate it while Debian does.

Somewhat illustrating its notoriety, graphics from the game are used on the website of the 2009 Free Software Foundation campaign Windows 7 Sins.

See also
Neko (software)
Xsnow
xTux

References

External links 

 
 XBill - Freecode

1994 video games
Open-source video games
Unix games
Linux games
Classic Mac OS games
Cultural depictions of Bill Gates
Maemo games
MacOS games
Parody video games
Video games developed in the United States
Windows games
Software wars
Android (operating system) games
IOS games
Video games based on real people